Acrossocheilus malacopterus is a species of ray-finned fish in the genus Acrossocheilus.

References

Malacopterus
Fish described in 2005